Lafora is a surname. Notable people with the surname include:

Alfredo de Zavala y Lafora (1893–1995), Spanish lawyer
Carlos Rodríguez Lafora (1884–1966), Spanish chess player and chess composer
Gonzalo Rodríguez Lafora (1886–1971), Spanish neurologist

See also 
Lafora disease, genetic disorder